Sarah Trone Garriott is an American politician and minister serving as a member of the Iowa Senate from the 14th district. Elected in November 2020, she assumed office on January 11, 2021.

Early life and education 
Garriott was born in Minneapolis. She earned a Bachelor of Arts degree in history from the College of St. Scholastica, a Master of Theological Studies from the Harvard Divinity School, and a Master of Divinity from the Lutheran School of Theology at Chicago. After earning her undergraduate degree, Garriot worked as a volunteer with AmeriCorps VISTA in New Mexico.

Career 
In 2004 and 2005, Garriott was a chaplain at the Thomas Jefferson University Hospital in Philadelphia. From 2005 to 2008, she was a chaplain at Lurie Children's Hospital in Chicago. She later worked as a pastor at Lutheran churches in Bergton, Virginia and Clive, Iowa. Since 2017, Garriott has worked as the director of interfaith engagement at the Des Moines Area Religious Council. Garriott was elected to the Iowa Senate in November 2020 and assumed office on January 11, 2021. Garriott is the ranking member of the Senate Natural Resources and Environment Committee.

Personal life 
Garriott is married to William Garriott, a professor at the Drake University Law School. The couple have two sons.

References 

People from Minneapolis
College of St. Scholastica alumni
Harvard Divinity School alumni
Lutheran School of Theology at Chicago alumni
Democratic Party Iowa state senators
Women state legislators in Iowa
Year of birth missing (living people)
Living people
21st-century American women